Leptoptilos lüi is an extinct species of large-bodied Leptoptilini stork that existed during the Middle Pleistocene. Along with Aegypius jinniushanensis, L. lüi is one of several new species of extinct birds discovered at Jinniushan, Liaoning, China. The extinct stork is named after Professor Zun-e Lü.

Extant members of the genus Leptoptilos are today found only found in the African and Asian tropics. L. lüi is the only member of Leptoptilos from the Pleistocene so far to have been discovered outside of its modern range.

Description
L. lüi is one of the largest Leptoptilos on record and might be larger than Leptoptilos titan and Leptoptilos robustus. The humerus and proximal phalanx are longer and more robust than those of any other Leptoptilos on record.

With very long wings, L. lüi was probably a good flyer that mainly relied on gliding and soaring on the thermal air currents available then, as the climate conditions in the region during the Middle Pleistocene was a lot warmer and more humid. L. lüi most likely relied on scavenging from Pleistocene megafauna for the bulk of its food source. The disappearance of Pleistocene megafauna and climate change are likely the primary causes of its extinction.

Notes

References

Bibliography

Leptoptilos
Pleistocene birds
Extinct animals of China
Fossil taxa described in 2012